The Heiwa PGM Championship was a professional golf tournament on the Japan Golf Tour. It was played for the first time in November 2013 at the Miho Golf Club in Miho, Ibaraki, Japan.

Winners

Notes

External links
Coverage on the Japan Golf Tour's official site

Former Japan Golf Tour events
Defunct golf tournaments in Japan
Sports competitions in Ibaraki Prefecture
Sports competitions in Chiba Prefecture
Sports competitions in Okinawa Prefecture
Recurring sporting events established in 2013
Recurring sporting events disestablished in 2019
2013 establishments in Japan
2019 disestablishments in Japan